Alexis Contin (born 19 October 1986) is a French speed skater. He is ranked 63 on the Adelskalender and is coached by Jan van Veen.

Contin made his international speedskating debut at the Speed Skating World Cup in December 2005. In January 2007 he competed at an international allround tournament for the first time, finishing 17th at the European Championships held at Collalbo.

In January 2008, Dutch newspaper De Telegraaf reported that Contin quit skating, saying that he felt he could not bring himself to focus entirely on longtrack skating. However, Contin made a return to competitive skating in the 2008–09 season.

He competed in the Dutch marathon circuit, until he made his return to the longtrack at the 2009 European Allround Championships at Heerenveen.

He competed at the 2010 Winter Olympics, finishing 4th in the 10,000 metres and 6th in the 5000.

Contin is the holder of the current French records on the 3000 and 5000 metres distances. He also held the French record on the 10000 metres distance for almost 10 years before losing it to Timothy Loubineaud in 2020.

Personal records

References

External links 
 

1986 births
French male speed skaters
Speed skaters at the 2010 Winter Olympics
Speed skaters at the 2014 Winter Olympics
Speed skaters at the 2018 Winter Olympics
Olympic speed skaters of France
Living people
Sportspeople from Saint-Malo
World Single Distances Speed Skating Championships medalists
Inline speed skaters
Competitors at the 2005 World Games